Botirjon Abdullaevich Akhmedov (born 20 December 1990), better known as Batyr Akhmedov, and previously Batuhan Gözgeç, is a Russian professional boxer. He is a two-time super-lightweight world title challenger, having challenged for the WBA (Regular) title in 2019, and the WBA title in 2022. As an amateur he represented Turkey at the 2016 Olympics.

Amateur career 
He won the gold medal at the 2015 International Kadyrov Tournament held in Grozny, Chechen Republic, Russia.

Akhmedov earned a quota spot for 2016 Summer Olympics after taking the bronze medal at the 2016 European Boxing Olympic Qualification Tournament in Samsun, Turkey.

Professional boxing career
Akhmedov made his professional debut on 23 February 2017, scoring a third-round technical knockout (TKO) over Dmitry Lavrinenko at the Forum in Nizhny Tagil, Russia.

After compiling a record of 7–0 (6 KOs) he faced Mario Barrios for the vacant WBA (Regular) super-lightweight title on 28 September 2019 at the Staples Center in Los Angeles, California. In a fight which saw Akhmedov have a knockdown scored against him after his gloves touched the canvas in the fourth round and a second knockdown in the twelfth and final round, Akhmedov lost via unanimous decision (UD), a decision which many described as controversial. Judge Jeremy Hayes scored the bout 116–111, judge Tim Cheatham scored it 115–111, and judge Zachary Young scored it 114–112.

Almost three years later, Akhmedov would challenge again for a vacant super-lightweight world title, this time the full WBA title against undefeated Alberto Puello on 20 August 2022. Puello won the fight by split decision. Two judges scored the fight 117–111 for Puello, while the third judge scored the fight 115–113.

Professional boxing record

References

1990 births
Living people
Turkish male boxers
Russian male boxers
Light-welterweight boxers
Welterweight boxers
Uzbekistani people of Tatar descent
Turkish people of Tatar descent
Uzbekistani emigrants to Turkey
Naturalized citizens of Turkey
Fenerbahçe boxers
People from Qashqadaryo Region
Boxers at the 2016 Summer Olympics
Olympic boxers of Turkey
Tatar sportspeople